Ada Svedin (born Hildegard Adelaide Edelgunde Kommnick; 2 January 1900 – 10 July 1975) was a German stage and film actress. She was married to the director Ludwig Czerny.

Selected filmography
 Miss Venus (1921)
 The Blonde Geisha (1923)
 The Prince and the Maid (1924)

References

Bibliography
 Ken Wlaschin. The Silent Cinema in Song, 1896-1929: An Illustrated History and Catalog of Songs Inspired by the Movies and Stars, with a List of Recordings. McFarland & Company, 2009.

External links

1900 births
1975 deaths
German stage actresses
German film actresses
German silent film actresses
20th-century German actresses
Actresses from Berlin